Gündüzler can refer to:

 Gündüzler, Keşan
 Gündüzler, Silifke